Hawley Heights is a neighborhood of Kendall, a CDP and unincorporated community in Miami-Dade County, Florida, United States.  It is located west of Pinecrest, and just south of Green-Mar Acres, a neighboring neighborhood.

Geography

References

Unincorporated communities in Miami-Dade County, Florida
Unincorporated communities in Florida